Stefan Bradl (born 29 November 1989) is a German professional motorcycle racer. Bradl is best known for winning the  Moto2 World Champion. Then he made the move to MotoGP in 2012 with LCR Honda. While in MotoGP, Bradl is best known for his performance at Laguna Seca getting the pole position and finishing second in the race behind Marc Marquez, ahead of Valentino Rossi. Bradl finished the 2013 season 7th, despite missing two races due to injury. This proved to be his highest ever MotoGP finish.

Bradl is the son of former racer Helmut Bradl. He is contracted as a test rider for Honda in MotoGP and makes occasional wild card appearances and acts as an injury replacement.

Career

125cc World Championship (2005–2009)
Born in Augsburg, West Germany, Bradl started his 125cc World Championship career in 2005 as a wild card for three races, competing in the 125cc German Championship with KTM. He took more wild card races in 2006, still with KTM. He had a terrible fracture when he was hit by another rider during practice for the 2006 Malaysian GP. Later that year he was competing again at the Red Bull KTM Junior.

Bradl was offered by Alberto Puig to ride his Repsol Honda factory 250cc team for 2007; he withdrew after a couple of tests, but did not stop racing. Later, he joined the 125cc Spanish Championship with Blusens Aprilia, winning the title just five points ahead of his teammate Scott Redding. Later he took a couple of wild card World Championship races, with the same team. Additionally, from the 2007 Portuguese GP onwards Blusens Aprilia Team principal Raúl Romero placed him on a second bike with veteran Pablo Nieto, replacing Dutchman Hugo van den Berg.

For 2008, rather than stay with Blusens Aprilia, he decided to ride for the German Grizzly Gas Kiefer Racing, on an official factory Aprilia RSA 125. He took his first win at Brno, fittingly a track his father won at in 1991.

Moto2 World Championship (2010–2011)

After moving up to the Moto2 class of Grand Prix racing in 2010, he went on to claim ninth in the championship, with one victory at Estoril.

2011 saw Bradl win four of the first six races, and maintained a healthy lead in the championship until Marc Márquez found significant speed halfway through the season. The championship seemed to be going down to the wire, with both Bradl and Márquez having a fair shot at the title with two rounds remaining. Márquez, however, suffered a heavy fall during free practice for the Malaysian Grand Prix, and was unable to race for the remainder of the season, due to eyesight problems. Bradl was therefore crowned the World Champion at the final race of the season in Valencia, Spain.

MotoGP World Championship (2012–2016)

LCR Honda (2012–2014)
Bradl was signed by the LCR Honda team for 2012. He had a good season, running consistently in the top-10, with a best result of fourth place obtained at the Italian Grand Prix. He completed the season in eighth place, winning the Rookie of the Year award.

Bradl battled consistently among the second group of riders in 2013, along with Valentino Rossi, Cal Crutchlow and Álvaro Bautista. The highlight of his season was a pole-position at the United States Grand Prix, at Laguna Seca, where he also finished second, achieving his first MotoGP podium. A crash towards the end of the season at the Malaysian Grand Prix – in which he broke an ankle – took him out of contention in the battle for fifth place with Bautista and Crutchlow. He closed the season in seventh place with 156 points.

In 2014, Bradl continued to ride for LCR Honda. However, on 2 August 2014, it was announced that Cal Crutchlow would join LCR Honda for the 2015 season and ride the factory-specification Honda RC213V. Bradl subsequently announced a move to the Forward Racing team for 2015, riding an open-specification bike.

Athinà Forward Racing (2015)
For the 2015 season, Bradl moved to Forward Racing, riding a Yamaha Forward – where he was joined by Loris Baz, moving into the series from the Superbike World Championship. At the midway point of the season, Bradl had collected 9 points, despite missing his home race at the Sanchsenring due to injury. After the summer break, Bradl parted company with the team, following the arrest of team boss Giovanni Cuzari.

Aprilia Racing Team Gresini (2015–2016)
In August, Bradl joined Aprilia Gresini Racing for the remainder of the 2015 season. His partnership with Gresini started with a 20th at Indianapolis, and scored his first points for the team, with 14th at Brno.

For the 2016 season, Bradl was partnered by Spanish rider Álvaro Bautista. He collected 63 points, with no poles, fastest laps and podiums. He finished the season ranked 16th overall.

Superbike World Championship (2017)
For the 2017 season, Bradl moved from MotoGP to the Superbike World Championship, riding a Honda of the RedBull Honda Team. He only raced 6 full rounds and 4 half-rounds; taking up 67 points and ranked 14th in the list.

Return to MotoGP (2018–present)

EG 0,0 Marc VDS, HRC Honda Team & LCR Honda (2018) 
In 2018, Bradl returned to MotoGP as a replacement rider for an injured Franco Morbidelli at EG 0,0 Marc VDS Racing in his home race at the Sachsenring. He made two wildcard entries for HRC Honda Team at the Czech Republic and San Marino rounds. Bradl replaced the injured Cal Crutchlow at LCR Honda for the final two rounds, finishing 13th in Malaysia and 9th in Valencia. He collected 10 points total on the season, and was ranked 24th overall.

Repsol Honda Team (2019–present)

In 2019, he was contracted as a test rider for the Honda works MotoGP team. He raced in the Spanish Grand Prix in Jerez as a wildcard entry and in the German, Czech Republic and Austrian Grand Prix as a replacement for the injured Jorge Lorenzo. Bradl finished 10th at Jerez as a wildcard rider. In his second outing as replacement for Jorge Lorenzo he finished 10th in Germany, 15th at Brno and 13th in Austria.

In 2020, Bradl was called up as a replacement rider for Marc Márquez from the Czech Republic round onwards, while Márquez was recovering from injuries sustained in an August crash at the Spanish Grand Prix. 

In 2021, Bradl was a replacement rider for injured Marquez in the early season. He finished in positions 11 and 14 with two consecutive weekend races at Losail, Doha. Bradl also had a wild card ride in 2021 at Jerez, finishing in position 12.

For 2022, in the third race of the season at Argentina on 3 April, Bradl finished in position 19 when deputising for Marc Márquez, who was injured in March a few hours before the Indonesian Grand Prix at Mandalika.

Career statistics

Grand Prix motorcycle racing

By season

By class

Races by year
(key) (Races in bold indicate pole position, races in italics indicate fastest lap)

Superbike World Championship

Races by year
(key) (Races in bold indicate pole position; races in italics indicate fastest lap)

References

External links

Profile on MotoGP.com
Profile on WorldSBK.com

1989 births
Living people
German motorcycle racers
125cc World Championship riders
Moto2 World Championship riders
Sportspeople from Augsburg
Gresini Racing MotoGP riders
Superbike World Championship riders
LCR Team MotoGP riders
Marc VDS Racing Team MotoGP riders
Repsol Honda MotoGP riders
MotoGP World Championship riders
Moto2 World Riders' Champions